Yun-Fei Ji (born 1963) is a Chinese painter. He has lived in New York since 1990.

Life

Biography
When he was 10 years old, Yun-Fei Ji's mother sent him to study with an officer who drew illustrations for the People's Liberation Army.
In 1982, he received a B.F.A. from the China Central Academy of Fine Arts, Beijing, P.R. China. During that time, the instructors at the Central Academy of Fine Arts still painted in a Socialist-realist propaganda style. In 1989, he received a M.F.A. from the University of Arkansas at Fayetteville in the Fulbright College of Arts and Sciences. Ji lives and works in Brooklyn, New York. He is represented by James Cohan Gallery.

Travel
Yun-Fei Ji took a trip to the ancient Silk Road area of northwest China. On this trip, he viewed Buddhist frescoes in the Mogao caves in Dunhuang, China. The narrative of the frescoes greatly influenced him and inspired him to create multiple works based on that expedition.
Ji also visited Louisiana after Hurricane Katrina, and made drawings of this experience. He says this about the experience:
"I saw this natural disaster as an example of government failure. And after the financial collapse, I saw similarities- how the government failed to do its job as a watchdog. It's very disproportionate in both cases how the people who put in all the work paid the price, and the people who benefited from all the work paid no price.".

Painting style

Yun-Fei paints traditionally, using the media ink and watercolor on rice paper and mulberry paper. In his painting process, he starts with multiple pencil drawings. When he wants to see something in color, he will paint it with ink or watercolor. His paintings generally include eerie looking characters.
Ji grew up with ghost stories, and he uses these as inspiration. He said:
"I use ghost stories as metaphors because it's an easy way to satirize human problems and issues.".

The ink and watercolor rendering at right demonstrates the artist's approach to imaginary creatures.  The image is from the last section of a 60 foot long handscroll, The Village and its Ghosts, from 2014.

His inspiration also includes historical, cultural, and political messages, such as memories from the time of Maoist rule. Ji has an interest in including household items in his works, such as machines, fabrics, and musical instruments. He is also interested in the literary aspect of art:
"I try to mimic the method that underlies the formation of early Chinese characters: I invent forms that are like words to describe the world.".

Selected solo exhibitions
2010: "Ghosts and Men from Badong", James Cohan Gallery, Shanghai
"Mistaking Each Other for Ghosts", James Cohan Gallery, New York, NY
2007: Frieze Art Fair, Zeno X Gallery, London England
2006: "Water That Floats the Boat Can Also Sink It", James Cohan Gallery, New York, NY
(November – December 2006)
2005: "Great News Comes From the Collective Farm", ZenoX, Antwerp, Belgium
2004: "Boxers", SAFN Museum, Reykyavik, Iceland (through January 9, 2005)
"The Empty City", organized by Shannon Fitzgerald, Contemporary Art Museum St. Louis, Missouri; traveled to Pierogi, Brooklyn, New York; Provisions Library,  
Gaea Foundation, Washington, DC; The Rose Museum, Brandeis University, Waltham, Massachusetts; Richard E. Peeler Art Center, DePauw University, Greencastle, Indiana (Feb– April 2005)
"Yun-Fei Ji: The East Wind", Institute of Contemporary Art, University of Pennsylvania, 
Philadelphia
2003: "The One-Hundred Old Names", ZenoX, Antwerp, Belgium and The Pratt Manhattan
Gallery, New York, NY
2002: "The Boxer, the Missionary, and their Gods", POST, Los Angeles, CA
2001: "New Work", Pierogi, Brooklyn, New York

Selected group exhibitions
2011: "East Ex East", Brand New Gallery, Milan, Italy
"The 11th Biennale de Lyon: A Terrible Beauty is Born", Lyon, France
2010: Hareng Saur: Ensor and Contemporary Art, S.M.A.K, Ghent, Belgium
2009: Medals of Dishonour, The British Museum, London, UK
7th Mercosul Biennial: Grito e Escuta [Screaming and Hearing], Porto Alegre, Rio Grande do Sul, Brazil
A Decade of Contemporary American Printmaking: 1999-2009, Visual Art Center of Academy of Arts and Design, Tsinghua University, Beijing, China
Compass in Hand: Selections from The Judith Rothschild Foundation Contemporary Drawings Collection, The Museum of Modern Art, New York, NY
"Chelsea visits Havana", Museo Nacional de Bellas Artes, Havana, Cuba
2008: "Displacement: The Three Gorges Dam and Contemporary Chinese Art", Smart Museum of Art, Chicago, IL, traveling to Salt Lake City Art Center, Salt Lake, and the Nasher Museum of Art at Duke University
"Darger-ism: Contemporary Artists and Henry Darger", American Folk Art Museum, New York, NY
"Two Chinas: Chen Qiulin and Yun-Fei Ji", Worcester Art Museum, Worcester, MA
"Mining Nature", James Cohan Gallery Shanghai, Shanghai, China
2007: "An Atlas of Events", Gulbenkian Foundation, Lisbon, Portugal
"Merging Influence: Eastern Elements in New American Art", Montserrat College of Art Galleries, Beverly, MA (August 27 – October 27, 2007)
2006: "A Usable Past: Selected Alumni from the Artist-in-Residence Studio Space Program", Henry Street Settlement, Abrons Art Center, New York, NY
"Process and Promise: Art Education and Community at the 92nd Street Y 1930-2005", 92nd Street Y, New York, NY
"Biella Prize for Engraving 2006, Art in the Age of Anxiety", curated by Jeremy Lewison, Museo del Territorio di Biella, Biella, Italy (March 18 – June 4, 2006) (catalogue).
"Now, Voyager", curated by Susan Canning, Islip Art Museum, East Islip, NY (February 8 – March 26)
2005: "REGENERATION: Contemporary Chinese Art From China and the U.S.", ASU Art Museum, Nelson Fine Arts Center, Tempe, AZ
"Here Comes the Boogey-Man", Chelsea Art Museum, New York, NY
"Wasteland: 21st Century Landscape", Roebling Hall, Brooklyn, NY
2004: "Drawn, Contemporary Drawings", Schick Art Gallery, Skidmore College, NY (November 11 - December 15)
"Art on Paper 2004", Weatherspoon Art Museum, University of North Carolina at Greensboro, NC (November 14, 2004 – January 23, 2005)
"Between The Lines", James Cohan Gallery, New York, NY (May 8 – June 26)
"Initial Encounters", organized and curated by the Viewing Program committee of the Drawing Center, The Arts Center of the Capital Region, Troy, NY(March 12–June 6)
"Regeneration: Contemporary Art from China and the US", curated by Dan Mills and Xiaoze Xie, organized by the Samek Art Gallery, Bucknell University, PA Opening at the Samek Art Gallery (January 26 – April 4) Traveling nationally between Summer 2004 and Fall 2006
"Open House: Working in Brooklyn", Brooklyn Museum of Art, Brooklyn, NY (April 16– August)
2003: "Thinking in Line, A Survey of Contemporary Drawing", curated by John Moore and Ron Janowich, University Gallery, University of Florida, Gainesville, FL (November 4–January 10, 2004)
"Reality/Fiction: (Re) Constructing Representation", Jamaica Center for Arts & Learning, Inc., Jamaica, NY (Oct. 25, 2003–January 17, 2004)
"Strange Worlds", The Bertha and Karl Leubsdorf Art Gallery at Hunter College (Oct. 30 – Dec. 13) (catalogue)
"For the Record: Drawing Contemporary Life", The Vancouver Art Gallery (June 28 – September  21)
"In Heat", Pierogi, Brooklyn, NY (July 5–28)
"Rendered", Sara Meltzer Gallery, New York, NY (June 17–August 1)
"Breaking Away", PS1 Contemporary Art Center, Clock Tower Fellowship exhibition 
"Pierogi Presents", curated by Joe Amrhein, Bernard Toale Gallery, Boston, MA
2002: "A Brush with Tradition: Chinese Tradition and Contemporary Art", Newark Museum, curated by Carmen Ramos, Newark, NJ (April 23-July 6)
"Beyond the Flâneur", ISE Cultural Foundation NY Gallery, curated by Yasufumi Nakamori, NY
"Whitney Biennial 2002", Whitney Museum of American Art, New York, NY
"Umano Animale Vegetale Minerale", Galleria Alessandra Bonomo, Rome, Italy
"Fantasyland", d’Amelio Terras, New York, NY
"Strolling Through an Ancient Shrine and Garden", ACME Gallery, Los Angeles, CA
"Selection 1; Made in Brooklyn", Wythe Studio, curated by Phong Bui, Brooklyn, NY
"Faux Real", Borusan Art & Culture, Istanbul
"PROJECT 3", curated by Elga Wimmer, Elga Wimmer Gallery, New York, NY
"Altoid’s Curiously Strong Collection", New Museum for Contemporary Art, New York, NY
"Fellow’s Exhibition", Art Association, Provincetown, RI
2001: "Best of the Season, Selected Work from the 2000-01 Manhattan Exhibition Season", The Aldrich Museum of Contemporary Art, Ridgefield, CT
"ArtForum Berlin 2001", work exhibited by Pierogi, Berlin
"Brooklyn!", Palm Beach Institute of Contemporary Art; Palm Beach, FL
"Selection", The Drawing Center, New York, NY
2000: "The Meat Market Art Fair", Pierogi, New York, New York
"The Old News", curated by Sabine Russ and Gregory Volk, P.S. 122 Gallery, New York, NY
"Haulin’ Ass: Pierogi in L.A.", POST, Los Angeles, CA
"Multiple Sensations", Yerba Buena Center For The Arts, San Francisco, CA
"Super Duper New York", Pierogi, Brooklyn, NY
1999: "Sensation", Richard Anderson Gallery, New York, NY
"Faculty Show", Lemmerman  Gallery, Jersey City, New Jersey
1998: "Yun-Fei Ji, Andrea Dezso, Randy Wray", Jack Tilton Gallery, New York, NY
1997: "Fermented", Parson's School of Design, New York, NY
"Relocating Landscape-East and West", Caldwell College, Caldwell, New Jersey
"Artist in the Marketplace Program", The Bronx Museum, New York, NY
"Travel-Sized", City College, New York, NY
"Reflecting Pool", Kenkeleban Gallery, New York, NY
"Twelve Cicadas in the Tree of Knowledge", Asian American Arts Center, New York, NY
1996: "Immigrant Artists from East and West", Gallery ONETWENTYEIGHT, New York, NY
1993: "Recent Paintings", Meredith Long Gallery, Houston, TX
1990: Introduction, Meredith Long Gallery, Houston, TX

He has works in the collection of Museum of Modern Art, The Drawing Center in New York, and the Worcester Art Museum.

Awards
2006-07   Parasol Unit Artist-In-Residence, London, England
2005-06  Rome Prize, American Academy in Rome, Italy
2004-05 Happy and Bob Doran Artist in Residence, Yale University, Connecticut
2004 Sharp Foundation Fellowship, New York
2003 PS1 Contemporary Arts National Studio Program Fellowship, Long Island City, New York
2002 Headland Center for the Arts, San Francisco, California
2001-02  Fine Arts Work Center, Provincetown, Rhode Island
2001  Art OMI International Arts Center, New York
1999   New York Foundation for the Arts Grant, works on paper, New York
1998    Joan Mitchell Foundation Grant
1997 The Pollock-Krasner Foundation Grant
1996 The Millay Colony for the Arts Residency, Austerlitz, New York
Artist in the Marketplace Program, The Bronx Museum, New York
1995 The Ucross Foundation, Clearmont, Wyoming
1994 Banff Center for the Arts, Banff, Canada
1993 The Macdowell Colony, Peterborough, New Hampshire
1991 Henry Street Settlement, New York

He was a recipient of the 2005/6 Jules Guerin Rome Prize Fellowship.

References
 Adler, Tracy L., Robert C. Morgan &  Stephen J. Goldberg, Yun-Fei Ji: The Intimate Universe, Prestel Publishing, New York, 2016, 
 Chiu, Melissa, Tan Lin, Gregory Volk, Paul Ha & Yun-Fei Ji, Yun-Fei Ji: The Empty City, Shannon Fitzgerald Contemporary Art Museum St. Louis, 2005 
 Tsai, Paula, Yun-Fei Ji: Water Work, Ucca Books, Beijing, 2013

Footnotes

External links
James Cohan Gallery - Yun-Fei Ji's entry works, biography, interview clip, articles and reviews
Zeno X Gallery - Yun-Fei Ji works, biography and cv

Living people
Contemporary painters
1963 births
Chinese expatriates in the United States
Chinese contemporary artists